Tetraulax gracilis is a species of beetle in the family Cerambycidae. It was described by Stephan von Breuning in 1938.

References

Tetraulaxini
Beetles described in 1938
Taxa named by Stephan von Breuning (entomologist)